"You Got It" is a 1989 song by Roy Orbison.

You Got It may also refer to:
 You Got It (album), a 1987 album by Gang Green
 "You Got It", a 1997 song by Alibi
 "You Got It", a 2017 song by Bryson Tiller from the album True to Self
 "You Got It", a 1978 song by Diana Ross, from the album Baby It's Me
 "You Got It", a 2007 song by Lucas Grabeel
 "You Got It (The Right Stuff)", a 1990 song by New Kids on the Block

See also
 You've Got It (disambiguation)
 "U Got It", a 2000 song by Cleopatra
 "U Got It", a 1983 song by Ratt from the EP Ratt